The Lincoln Professor of Classical Archaeology and Art is a chair at the University of Oxford, England. It is associated with Lincoln College, Oxford.

Holders of the Chair 
 William Mitchell Ramsay (1885 to 1886); first incumbent
 Percy Gardner (1887 to 1925)
 John Beazley (1925 to 1956)
 Bernard Ashmole (1956 to 1961)
 Martin Robertson (1961 to 1978)
 John Boardman (1978 to 1994)
 Roland Smith (1995 to present)

See also 
 List of professorships at the University of Oxford

References 

 
Classical Archaeology and Art, Lincoln
Classical Archaeology and Art, Lincoln, Oxford
Classical Archaeology and Art, Lincoln, Oxford